The 1972 Swedish speedway season was the 1972 season of motorcycle speedway in Sweden.

Individual

Individual Championship
The 1972 Swedish Individual Speedway Championship final was held on 29 September in Borås. Anders Michanek won the Swedish Championship.

Junior Championship
 
Winner - Tommy Pettersson

Team

Team Championship
Bysarna won division 1 and were declared the winners of the Swedish Speedway Team Championship for the second successive year. The Bysarna team included Sören Sjösten and Christer Löfqvist.

Dackarna and Indianerna won the second division east and west respectively, while Gamarna  won the third division.

See also 
 Speedway in Sweden

References

Speedway leagues
Professional sports leagues in Sweden
Swedish
Seasons in Swedish speedway